Araeotis fragilis is a species of beetles in the family Cerambycidae, the only species in the genus Araeotis.

References

Graciliini
Monotypic Cerambycidae genera